Gyirmót FC Győr is a Hungarian football club based in Gyirmót , a suburb of Győr. The team currently plays in the second division (Nemzeti Bajnokság II) of the Hungarian championship.

History

The club was founded in 1993 and its colors are yellow and blue.

In the 2014–15 Nemzeti Bajnokság II season Gyirmót could not get promoted to the first division since they collected only two points in their last three matches. On the 28th day they lost at home to Sopron (0–1), drew with Mezőkövesd (2–2), and drew with Siófok (2–2). They finished third in the 2014–15 season.

On 11 July 2015, Gyirmót beat Serie A club A.S. Roma 2–1 in a training match in Pinzolo, Italy.

On 14 May 2016, Gyirmót beat Soproni VSE 3–1 at the Káposztás utcai Stadion in Sopron and won the 2015–16 Nemzeti Bajnokság II season and got promoted to the Nemzeti Bajnokság I for the first time in the club's history.

In the 2020–21 Nemzeti Bajnokság II, Gyirmót finished second and; therefore, they were promoted to the Nemzeti Bajnokság I. Gyirmót could win 13 matches during the second of the season, beating the winners Debreceni VSC away and drawing with Vasas SC away. Since both Vasas and Gyirmót had the same amount of points at the end of the seasons, the number of victories counted. According to Nemzeti Sport, the key footballer was László Lencse who scored 11 goals in the season.

On 26 February 2022, Gyirmót drew with Ferencvárosi TC at the Ferencváros Stadion on the 22nd round of the 2021–22 Nemzeti Bajnokság I season.

Honours
Nemzeti Bajnokság II:
Winners (1): 2015–16
Runner-Up (1): 2020–21

Current squad

Other players under contract

Out on loan

Season results

References

External links
 Official site 
 Gyirmót SE squad
 Stadium information

 
Football clubs in Hungary
1993 establishments in Hungary
Association football clubs established in 1993
Sport in Győr